Lirularia iridescens is a species of sea snail, a marine gastropod mollusk in the family Trochidae, the top snails.

Description
The height of the shell attains 7 mm, its diameter 6½ mm. The rather thick and solid shell is imperforate or a trifle rimate and has a globose-conical shape. It is vividly iridescent under a thin brownish cuticle, the reflections chiefly green and golden. The spire is more or less elevated. The minute apex is acute. The sutures are impressed. The about 5 whorls are quite convex, the last globose, rounded, encircled by about 16 delicate lirae, above separated by wide interstices, which are lightly obliquely striate, and often spirally striate. On the base of the shell, the lirae are closer and more regularly spaced, nearly as wide as the interstices. The lirae are either uniform brown or articulated brown and yellowish. There are sometimes short brown flammules below the sutures. The lirae or keels are very widely separated about the middle of the whorl. The aperture is subcircular, almost smooth (a trifle sulcate) within, and vividly iridescent. The columella is arcuate, a trifle dilated at the base, and either concealing the perforation above or leaving a narrow chink.

Distribution
This marine species occurs off Japan and in the Northwest Pacific Ocean.

References

 P. Bartsch (1915), Report on the Turton collection of South African marine mollusks, with additional notes on other South African shells contained in the United States National Museum; Bulletin of the United States National Museum v. 91 (1915)
 Kantor Yu.I. & Sysoev A.V. (2006) Marine and brackish water Gastropoda of Russia and adjacent countries: an illustrated catalogue. Moscow: KMK Scientific Press. 372 pp. + 140 pls. page(s): 36

External links
 

iridescens
Gastropods described in 1863